Kolthoff is a surname. Notable people with the surname include:

Erick Kolthoff (born 1961), Puerto Rican judge 
Gustaf Kolthoff (1845–1913), Swedish naturalist
Izaak Kolthoff (1894–1993), Dutch chemist